The 16th annual Berlin International Film Festival was held from 24 June – 5 July 1966. The Golden Bear was awarded to the British film Cul-de-sac directed by Roman Polanski.

Jury
The following people were announced as being on the jury for the festival:
 Pierre Braunberger, producer (France) - Jury President
 Franz Seitz, director, screenwriter and producer (West Germany)
 Emilio Villalba Welsh, writer (Argentina)
 Khwaja Ahmad Abbas, director, screenwriter, journalist and writer (India)
 Pier Paolo Pasolini,  filmmaker, poet and writer (Italy)
 Lars Forssell, poet, journalist and academic (Sweden)
 Hollis Alpert, writer and film critic (United States)
 Helmuth de Haas, journalist and writer (West Germany)
 Kurt Heinz, composer (West Germany)

Films in competition
The following films were in competition for the Golden Bear award:

Key
{| class="wikitable" width="550" colspan="1"
| style="background:#FFDEAD;" align="center"| †
|Winner of the main award for best film in its section
|}

Awards

The following prizes were awarded by the Jury:
 Golden Bear: Cul-de-sac by Roman Polanski
 Silver Bear for Best Director: Carlos Saura for La caza
 Silver Bear for Best Actress: Lola Albright for Lord Love a Duck
 Silver Bear for Best Actor: Jean-Pierre Léaud for Masculin, féminin
 Silver Bear Extraordinary Jury Prize: 
 Jakten by Yngve Gamlin
 Schonzeit für Füchse by Peter Schamoni
 Special Recognition: Nayak by Satyajit Ray
Youth Film Award
Best Short Film Suitable for Young People: High Steel by Don Owen
Best Feature Film Suitable for Young People: Masculin Féminin by Jean-Luc Godard
Youth Film Award – Honorable Mention
Best Feature Film Suitable for Young People: Naked Hearts by Édouard Luntz
FIPRESCI Award
Seasons of Our Love by Florestano Vancini
FIPRESCI Award – Honorable Mention
Max Ophüls
Interfilm Award
Seasons of Our Love by Florestano Vancini
Interfilm Award – Honorable Mention
Masculin Féminin by Jean-Luc Godard
OCIC Award
Georgy Girl by Silvio Narizzano
UNICRIT Award
Nayak by Satyajit Ray

References

External links
 16th Berlin International Film Festival 1966
1966 Berlin International Film Festival
Berlin International Film Festival:1966  at Internet Movie Database

16
1966 film festivals
1966 in West Germany
1960s in West Berlin